These are the official results of the athletics competition at the 2010 Central American and Caribbean Games which took place on July 24–30, 2010 in Mayagüez, Puerto Rico.

Men's results

100 meters

Heats – July 25Wind:Heat 1: +1.1 m/s, Heat 2: +1.1 m/s, Heat 3: +1.9 m/s, Heat 4: +1.4 m/s

Final – July 25Wind:+0.7 m/s

200 meters

Heats – July 27Wind:Heat 1: -1.0 m/s, Heat 2: -1.0 m/s, Heat 3: +2.8 m/s, Heat 4: +2.8 m/s

Final – July 27Wind:0.0 m/s

400 meters

Heats – July 25

Final – July 26

800 meters

Heats – July 27

Final – July 29

1500 meters
July 26

5000 meters
July 30

10,000 meters
July 26

Marathon
July 25

110 meters hurdles

Heats – July 25Wind:Heat 1: +2.2 m/s, Heat 2: +1.6 m/s

Final – July 25Wind:-0.1 m/s

400 meters hurdles

Heats – July 25

Final – July 27

3000 meters steeplechase
July 29

4 x 100 meters relay
Heats – July 29

Final – July 29

4 x 400 meters relay
July 30

20 kilometers walk
July 26

High jump
July 30

Pole vault
July 27

Long jump
July 26

Triple jump
July 29

Shot put
July 25

Discus throw
July 27

Hammer throw
July 25

Javelin throw
July 25

Decathlon
July 29–30

Women's results

100 meters

Heats – July 25Wind:Heat 1: +2.3 m/s, Heat 2: +1.4 m/s, Heat 3: +1.8 m/s

Final – July 25Wind:0.0 m/s

200 meters

Heats – July 25Wind:Heat 1: +0.9 m/s, Heat 2: +1.1 m/s

Final – July 27Wind:-0.9 m/s

400 meters

Heats – July 25

Final – July 26

800 meters
July 29

1500 meters
July 26

5000 meters
July 29

10,000 meters
July 25

Marathon
July 25

100 meters hurdles

Heats – July 25Wind:Heat 1: +0.2 m/s, Heat 2: 0.0 m/s

Final – July 25Wind:+0.1 m/s

400 meters hurdles

Heats – July 26

Final – July 27

3000 meters steeplechase
July 30

4 x 100 meters relay
July 29

4 x 400 meters relay
July 30

20 kilometers walk
July 24

High jump
July 26

Pole vault
July 25

Long jump
July 30

Triple jump
July 27

Shot put
July 26

Discus throw
July 29

Hammer throw
July 24

Javelin throw
July 27

Heptathlon
July 25–26

References

Central American and Caribbean Games
2010